Crocus pelistericus  is a species of flowering plant in the genus Crocus of the family Iridaceae. It is a cormous perennial native from eastern Albania to northern Greece.

References

pelistericus